Baffour Kyei (born July 7, 1989) is a Ghanaian footballer who plays for Eleven Wise.

In January 2009 he moved from Kessben F.C. to Eleven Wise, and was formerly a member of the youth squad from West Ham United (Kumasi).

References 

1989 births
Living people
Ghanaian footballers
Sekondi Wise Fighters players
Medeama SC players
Association football midfielders